The 1914 Michigan Agricultural Aggies football team represented Michigan Agricultural College (MAC) as an independent during the 1914 college football season. In their fourth year under head coach John Macklin, the Aggies compiled a 5–2 record and outscored their opponents 188 to 57.

Schedule

Game summaries

Michigan

On October 17, 1914, Michigan Agricultural lost a close game against Michigan by 3-0 score at College Field in East Lansing.

References

Michigan Agricultural
Michigan State Spartans football seasons
Michigan Agricultural Aggies football